The University of Lucca was an Italian university located in Lucca (LU), Italy, established in 1785 by the government of the Republic of Lucca. The university  disappearing for good in 1867.
There had previously been several attempts in the medieval period to found a University of Lucca: On 6 June 1369   Emperor Charles IV granted  Lucca a charter for the  establishment of a Studium Generale, confirmed on 13 September 1387   by Pope Urban VI.  No university was actually founded, but again in 1455  Gonfalonier Giovanni Gigli tried to raise funds for a university, but once more it did not result in an actual institution.

In modern times     there are three university colleges in Lucca: The Istituto Musicale (founded in 1843, whose students included  Giacomo Puccini), IMT School for Advanced Studies Lucca - a graduate school dedicated to doctoral and post doctoral education and research - and the Campus Studi del Mediterraneo ( offering a Bachelor's degree course in Tourism Science and Master's degree course in Planning and Management of Mediterranean Tourism).

References 

Barsanti P., Il Pubblico Insegnamento a Lucca dal secolo XIV alla fine del secolo XVII, Tipografia Marchi, Lucca 1905
Busti L., L'Università Lucchese. In Actum Luce, Rivista di Studi Lucchesi, Istituto Storico Lucchese, Anno XXIX N. 1 - 2, Lucca, 2000, pp. 155 – 204
Chelini S., La Scuola Chirurgica lucchese in un manoscritto del ‘700, in Scientia Verum, Collana di studi per la Storia della Medicina per la pubblicazione delle fonti, diretta e curata Giorgio Del Guerra Anno XVII, Pisa, Giardini Editore, 1968.
Cole T., "Studenti lucchesi all'università di Lovanio nel Quattro e Cinquecento". "Studenten uit Lucca aan de Universiteit van Leuven in de zestiende eeuw - een overzicht". In Rivista di archeologia, storia e costume (Istituto Storico Lucchese), 30 (2002), p. 75-94
Del Prete L., Cenni storici sulla origine e progressi della pubblica Biblioteca di Lucca. In Atti della Reale Accademia Lucchese, tomo XX Giusti. Lucca 1876
Giambastiani M., Guida dell'Orto Botanico Lucchese, Titania Editrice, Lucca 2007
Manfredini A. e Giambastiani M., Le Collezioni Scientifiche Lucchesi, Vol. I Le raccolte zoologiche dei Vertebrati, Istituto per la Ricerca sulla Biodiversità e l'Etica delle Biotecnologie, Lucca, 2008
Orsini Begani., Lo Studio Lucchese attraverso i tempi, In La Scuola in Toscana - Bollettino del R. Provveditorato agli Studi di Firenze Anno II - n. 8, Firenze 1925
Sabbatini R., Lo Studium Lucchese e la formazione della classe dirigente, in Quaderni della Fondazione Campus I Fondazione Campus Studi del Mediteraneo, Lucca 2006, pp. 21 – 63.
Schiaparelli L. Il codice 490 della Biblioteca Capitolare Feliniana e la Scuola Scrittoria Lucchese (Sec. VIII - IX) Biblioteca Apostolica Vaticana, Roma 1973
Tommasi G., Storia di Lucca, Vieusseux, Firenze 1847
Torselli V., Delle scienze a Lucca e dei loro coltivatori, Giusti, Lucca 1843

Defunct universities and colleges in Italy
Lucca
Lucca
1785 establishments in Italy